Scott Johnston is a Canadian provincial politician, who was elected to the Legislative Assembly of Manitoba in the 2016 Manitoba general election. He represents the electoral district of Assiniboia as a member of the Progressive Conservative Party of Manitoba. He is currently the Minister of Seniors and Long-term Care.

Johnston was first was elected as the Member of the Legislative Assembly of Manitoba for the riding of St. James in the 2016 election. He was reelected in the 2019 Manitoba general election, in which he moved to the neighbouring district of Assiniboia.

Johnston's father, Frank Johnston, was an MLA  from 1969 to 1988, and served as a cabinet minister in the Progressive Conservative government of Sterling Lyon.

References 

Living people
21st-century Canadian politicians
Politicians from Winnipeg
Progressive Conservative Party of Manitoba MLAs
Year of birth missing (living people)